Felsőbányaite or basaluminite is a hydrated aluminium sulfate mineral with formula: Al4(SO4)(OH)10·4H2O. It is a rare white to pale yellow mineral which typically occurs as globular masses and incrustations or as minute rhombic crystals. It crystallizes in the monoclinic crystal system. 

It occurs as a weathering product under acidic conditions associated with pyrite or marcasite decomposition. Associated minerals include hydrobasaluminite, hydroargillite, meta-aluminite, allophane, gibbsite, gypsum and aragonite.

Felsőbányaite was first described in 1853 for an occurrence in the Baia Sprie mine, Baia Sprie (Felsőbánya), Maramureș County, Romania, and named for the locality. The mineral name basaluminite was used for an occurrence of the same mineral in England in 1948 and discredited by the International Mineralogical Association (IMA) in 2006.

References

Sulfate minerals
Monoclinic minerals
Minerals in space group 4